The 2017 UCLA Bruins football team represented the University of California, Los Angeles during the 2017 NCAA Division I FBS football season. The Bruins  played its home games at the Rose Bowl in Pasadena, California.  They began the season coached by sixth-year head coach Jim L. Mora. They competed as members of the South Division of the Pac-12 Conference.

On November 19, one day after UCLA lost its third consecutive match-up against its crosstown rival USC, Jim Mora was fired. He finished the season 5–6, with a 3–5 record in Pac-12 play. Following Mora's dismissal, offensive coordinator Jedd Fisch was chosen to serve as interim head coach for the remainder of the season.

The Bruins won all six of their home games and lost all six of their road games during the regular season. In all, they were outscored by their opponents by a combined score of 476 to 422.

Recruiting

Position key

Recruits

The Bruins signed a total of 18 recruits.

Personnel

Coaching Staff

Roster

Schedule

Game summaries

Texas A&M

Josh Rosen completed 35 of 59 passes for 491 yards and four touchdowns to rally UCLA to a 45–44 win over Texas A&M.  The Bruins overcame a 34-point deficit, the largest comeback in school history and the second-most ever in the Football Bowl Subdivision (FBS). Michigan State had a 35-point comeback win over Northwestern in 2006.

Hawaii

Rosen threw a career-high five touchdowns, including three to Darren Andrews, in a 56–23 win over Hawaii. The quarterback completed 22 of 25 passes for 329 yards. It was the 12th 300-yard game of his career, breaking the school record of 11 set previously by Cade McNown. The Bruins raced out to a 14–0 lead after the first quarter and 35–7 at halftime. Theo Howard finished the game with a career-high seven receptions for 110 yards with a touchdown.

Memphis

UCLA rallied from a 10-point deficit in the third quarter before falling 48–45 to Memphis. Rosen finished with 463 yards and four touchdowns, but also threw his first two interceptions of the season. The first was by the Tigers' linebacker Tim Hart, who returned it for a 60-yard touchdown to put Memphis ahead 41–31. UCLA had entered the national rankings that week at No. 25.

Stanford

Colorado

Arizona

The Bruins surrendered 457 yards rushing to Arizona and were outgained 605–409 in total yards in a 47–30 loss, the first defeat to the Wildcats in UCLA coach Jim Mora's tenure. Rosen was 20-for-34 passing for 219 yards with no touchdowns and a career-high three interceptions. It was his first time in the season he was held under 300 yards, ending a streak of seven games dating back to 2016.

Oregon

Washington

Utah

Arizona State

After being out the previous week with a concussion, Rosen returned to the lineup and threw for 381 yards with one touchdown and also scored on a 1-yard run in a 44–37 win over the Arizona State Sun Devils. He connected with Jordan Lasley on a 22-yard score on the first play of the fourth quarter, as the Bruins outscored the Sun Devils 10–3 in the final quarter to pull away. Starting slowly, Rosen was just 10-for-25 at halftime, but was 15-of-20 for 225 yards in the second half.

USC

In his first matchup against USC quarterback Sam Darnold, Rosen was 32 of 52 passing for 421 yards along with three touchdowns and an interception in a 28–23 loss to the Trojans. The two passers were among the top prospects for the 2018 NFL draft.

With their loss to USC, the Bruins finished the regular season with a winless 0–6 record on the road and extended their overall road losing streak to 10 games. Additionally, this was head coach Jim Mora's final game at UCLA, as he was fired the following morning.

California

In the regular season finale against California, the Bruins won 30–27 to become bowl-eligible. Rosen led the Bruins to a 17–9 lead at the half, but was held out the rest of the game for precautionary reasons after he suffered three sacks, including one late in the second quarter when he was slow to get up after being thrown to the ground. He finished 13-of-18 passing for 202 yards and two touchdowns. UCLA finished undefeated at home for the first time since 2005.

Kansas State–Cactus Bowl

Officials: Jer. Magallanes (Referee); Johnnie Forte (Umpire); Matt Fitzgerald(Linesman); Tim Graham (Line Judge); Rob Luklan (Back Judge); Wayne Rundell (Field Judge); George Liotus (Side Judge).

Rankings

Notes
 July 1, 2017 – Apparel agreement with Under Armour begins
 August 1, 2017 – The Wasserman Football Center is dedicated
 August 2, 2017 – Training camp starts at Spaulding Field 
 August 5, 2017 – Former player Kenny Easley is inducted into Pro-Football Hall-of-Fame
 November 19, 2017 - Jim Mora is fired; Jedd Fisch is named interim head coach
 November 25, 2017 – Chip Kelly named head football coach
 November 28, 2017 – Kenny Young named Pac-12 Player of Week

Awards and honors
 Sep. 5 – Josh Rosen was named Pac-12 Conference Offensive Player-of-the-week

References

UCLA
UCLA Bruins football seasons
UCLA Bruins football